Treehouse is the second album by Canadian band The Grapes of Wrath, released in 1987 on Nettwerk.

"Peace of Mind" was the band's first single to reach the RPM singles charts in Canada, peaking at #56. "Backward Town" and "O Lucky Man" were also released as singles.

Background
The album was produced by Tom Cochrane. However, he departed the project slightly before it was finished, after conflicting with engineer Ric Arboit over "Peace of Mind"; Cochrane disliked the song and wanted to stop working on it before Arboit or the band thought it was finished. Arboit and Dave Ogilvie finished the final mixes.

Track listing 
 "O Lucky Man" (3:26)
 "Backward Town" (4:06)  	
 "How Long" (3:04)
 "Very Special Day" (4:00)
 "Try" (3:30)
 "At Your Soul" (3:39)
 "Peace of Mind" (3:41)
 "Amused" (0:30)
 "Amused" (4:44)
 "So Many Times" (4:13)  	
 "Jewel in the Hand" (3:13)
 "Completely Lost" (4:33)
 "Run You Down" (2:41)
 "Seems Like Fate" (4:36)

References

The Grapes of Wrath (band) albums
1987 albums
Nettwerk Records albums